Adolph Hermann Blohm  (born 23 June 1848 in Lübeck; died 12 March 1930 in Hamburg) was a German shipbuilder and company founder of Blohm+Voss.

Life 
His father was German merchant Georg Blohm from Lübeck (1801-1878). He studied at ETH Zurich in Switzerland.
Together with Ernst Voss he founded on 5 April 1877 German company Blohm & Voss as a general partnership, to build steel-hulled ships. They established a shipyard on the island of Kuhwerder, near the Free and Hanseatic City of Hamburg,

On 29 December 1884 he was founding member of German organisation Verband für Schiffbau und Meerestechnik in Hamburg.
Blohm was married with Emmi Alwine Westphal. His sons Rudolf (* 1885) and Walther (* 1887) worked in company Blohm+Voss.

Awards 
 1907: Grashof-Denkmünze

Literature 
 Erich Gercken: Die Lübecker Familie Blohm. In: Der Wagen 1964, p. 123–131.
 Sibylle Küttner: Blohm, Hermann. In: Hamburgische Biografie. Band 3, Wallstein, Göttingen 2006, p. 45–47.
 Christian Ostersehlte: Blohm, Hermann, in: Biographisches Lexikon für Schleswig-Holstein und Lübeck, edition 11, Neumünster 2000, p. 40–43 , corrected .
 Hans Joachim Schröder: Hermann Blohm. Gründer der Werft Blohm & Voss, Hamburg 2011 (Mäzene für Wissenschaft, edition 10), .
 Friedrich-Christian Stahl: Blohm, Adolph Hermann. in: Neue Deutsche Biographie (NDB). edition 2, Duncker & Humblot, Berlin 1955, p. 312 f.

External links 

 Deutsche Biographie.de: Hermann Blohm (German)

References 

1930 deaths
1848 births
German company founders
German industrialists
19th-century German businesspeople
20th-century German businesspeople
Businesspeople from Lübeck
German naval architects